Miss Disarray is the first single from the Gin Blossoms 2010 album No Chocolate Cake. The single barely missed out on Billboard's Adult Top 40 Chart.

"Miss Disarray" gathered a sizable amount of airplay on Hot AC and reached the Top 50 on that format during late October 2010.

References

Gin Blossoms songs
2010 singles
2010 songs
429 Records singles
Songs written by Jesse Valenzuela
Songs written by Danny Wilde (musician)